Ali Barkah (born July 30, 1988) is an Indonesian professional footballer who plays as a goalkeeper for Liga 3 club PSGC Ciamis.

Club statistics

Hounors

Clubs
Pelita Jaya U-21
 Indonesia Super League U-21: 2008-09
PSS Sleman
 Divisi Utama LPIS: 2013

References

External links

1988 births
Living people
Association football goalkeepers
Indonesian footballers
Liga 1 (Indonesia) players
Pelita Jaya FC players
Persela Lamongan players
People from Banyumas Regency
Sportspeople from Central Java